Kinross services is a motorway service station near Kinross, Scotland. The service station is located next to the M90 motorway and is accessed using motorway junction 6 in both the northbound and southbound directions. It is owned by Moto.

It is the most northerly motorway service station in the United Kingdom.

History
The services opened in 1982.

In 2011 it was announced that Moto planned to demolish and rebuild the services, with new access via a roundabout.

References

External links 
Kinross - Motorway Services Online
Moto

Moto motorway service stations
Motorway service areas in Scotland
Kinross